Extracellular matrix protein 1 is a protein that in humans is encoded by the ECM1 gene.

This gene encodes an extracellular protein containing motifs with a cysteine pattern characteristic of the cysteine pattern of the ligand-binding "double-loop" domains of the albumin protein family. This gene maps outside the epidermal differentiation complex (EDC), a cluster of three gene families involved in epidermal differentiation. Alternatively spliced transcript variants encoding distinct isoforms have been described.

Diseases 
ECM1 is implicated in breast cancer, thyroid cancer, hepatocellular carcinoma, and other cancers, and also in ulcerative colitis  Germline mutations in ECM-1 cause the genetic disease lipoid proteinosis. Autoimmune attack on ECM-1 is responsible for lichen sclerosus.(see the Atlas of Genetics and Cytogenetics in Oncology and Haematology,).

See also
 Lipoid proteinosis

References

Further reading

Extracellular matrix proteins